Preben Uglebjerg (16 January 1931 – 31 May 1968) was a Danish film actor and entertainer. He appeared in nine films between 1946 and 1963. He was born in Glostrup, Denmark and was killed in a late night traffic accident of unknown cause.

Filmography
 Støt står den danske sømand (1948)
 This Is Life (1953)
 Vi som går stjernevejen (1956)
 Für zwei Groschen Zärtlichkeit (1957)
 Laan mig din kone (1957)
 Amor i telefonen (1957)
 Det lille hotel (1958)
 Pigen og vandpytten (1958)
 Han, hun og pengene (1963)

References

External links

1931 births
1968 deaths
People from Glostrup Municipality
Danish male film actors
20th-century Danish male actors